This is a list of science fiction comedy works—those mixing soft science fiction or science fantasy with comedy.

Literature

 Douglas Adams' novels:
The Hitchhiker's Guide to the Galaxy and sequels
Dirk Gently's Holistic Detective Agency
 Robert Asprin's Phule series
 Fredric Brown's Martians, Go Home and other novels and short works.
 Steven Erikson's Willful Child
Jasper Fforde's novel The Eyre Affair
 David S. Garnett's Stargonauts, Bikini Planet and Space Wasters
 Most of Ron Goulart's work
 Rob Grant and Doug Naylor's Red Dwarf
 The novels of Rob Grant (Colony, Incompetence and Fat).
 Harry Harrison's Stainless Steel Rat, Star Smashers of the Galaxy Rangers and Bill, the Galactic Hero novels
 Simon Haynes's Hal Spacejock novels
 Eric Idle's The Road to Mars
 Stanislaw Lem's novel Cyberiad and his Ijon Tichy stories.
 Larry Niven's collection The Draco Tavern
 John Scalzi's Redshirts: A Novel with Three Codas
 Much of Robert Sheckley's work
 Jonathan Swift's novel Gulliver's Travels, a proto-science fiction satire
 Kurt Vonnegut's novel The Sirens of Titan, and a lot of his work, including Slaughterhouse-Five
 Much of the work of Connie Willis
 D. Harlan Wilson's novels Dr. Identity and Codename Prague
 The novels of John Sladek.
 Charles Yu's novel How to Live Safely in a Science Fictional Universe

Films

Television

There are many animated Japanese series which use a science fiction-comedy or science fiction-fantasy-comedy setting. Urusei Yatsura, Dr. Slump, FLCL, Irresponsible Captain Tylor and Tenchi Muyo! are examples.

Video games
Giants: Citizen Kabuto
Ratchet & Clank series
Space Quest series
Leather Goddesses of Phobos series
Mother series
Portal series
Day of the Tentacle
Borderlands series
Earthworm Jim series
Rex Nebular and the Cosmic Gender Bender

Machinima
Red vs. Blue (2003–present)

Web series and streaming television
Lobo (2000)
The Crew (2008–present)
Voyage Trekkers (2011–present)
Other Space (2015–present)

Webcomics
Starslip Crisis (2005–present)
Brewster Rockit: Space Guy! (2004–present)
Schlock Mercenary (2000–present)

Manga and anime
 Hyper Police series by Minoru Tachikawa
 Gin Tama series by Hideaki Sorachi

Radio
The Hitchhiker's Guide to the Galaxy (1978–2005)
Canadia: 2056 (2007–present)
Nebulous (2005–2008)
Space Hacks (2007–2008)
The Spaceship (2005–2008)
Undone (2006–2010)

Audio
Ruby the Galactic Gumshoe (1982–present)

See also
 Comic fantasy

References

 
Comedy genres
Science fiction genres